Dead Boys is a science fiction novel by British writer Richard Calder, first published in 1994.

The novel is the second in Calders 'Dead' trilogy, and is set six months after the events described in the novel Dead Girls.

Synopsis and influences 

Richard Calder declared:
 
{{bquote|I was certainly influenced by the New Wave...The idea, for instance, that SF could go anywhere and appropriate the stylistic and cultural concerns of writers like William Burroughs...In other words, the New Wave encouraged a belief that SF could be radical and experimental literature. See New Wave science fiction}}

Reception
Calder declared about his novels:

A reviewer for Kirkus Reviews wrote that this book is:

The review in Publishers Weekly'' stated:

References

1994 British novels
1994 science fiction novels
HarperCollins books